This is a list of sports played in the biennial Southeast Asian Games. Unlike the Olympic games, there are no official limits to the number of sports which may be contested, and the range may be decided by the organising host pending approval by the Southeast Asian Games Federation. Albeit for some core sports which must be featured, the host is also free to introduce other sports. Over time, this has meant as much as 43 sports in the 24th edition of the games, and the programme has included relatively obscure sports such as arnis, finswimming and pétanque.

In the 30th edition of the Games, there are medals in 56 different sports that will be contested—the most in its history.

History
The Southeast Asian Peninsular Games, as the Southeast Asian Games was then known, was first held in Bangkok in 1959 with 12 sports, namely aquatics, athletics, badminton, basketball, boxing, cycling, football, shooting, table tennis, tennis, volleyball, and weightlifting. All of these events are Olympic sports, and most are considered core sports which are compulsory in all editions of the games.

Sports
The following sports (or disciplines of a sport) are part of the current program or were contested before, and are listed alphabetically according to the name used by the IOC. The figures in each cell indicate the number of events for each sport contested at the respective Games; a bullet denotes that the sport was contested as a demonstration sport. A "Y" is used to indicate that a sport was played but the number of events is not yet established.

Twelve of the sports (Aquatics, baseball and softball, basketball, cycling, equestrian, football, gymnastics, handball, hockey, volleyball, winter sports, and wrestling) consist of multiple disciplines. Disciplines from the same sport are grouped under the same colour:

 Aquatics –
 Baseball and softball –
 Basketball –
 Cycling –
 Equestrian –
 Football –
 Gymnastics –
 Volleyball –
 Winter sports –
 Wrestling

Non-Olympic sports
The Southeast Asian Games features numerous non-Olympic sports in its programme, reflecting the popularity of some sports to the region, or as a means of introducing more obscure sports to the region and beyond. Some sports dropped from the Olympic programme may still be retained in the SEAG, although the games does not feature all of the Olympic sports, often in favour of the traditional ones.

Traditional sports

References

Sports at multi-sport events by competition